Squalius janae, commonly known as the Istrian chub, is a species of freshwater fish in the carp family Cyprinidae. It was first described in 2010 from the Dragonja River drainage in Slovenia. Since then they have also been found in the Boljunčica and Pazinčica river drainages in Istria, Croatia.

Description

It has a long head, a large eye with a yellow iris, a pointed conical snout, a long straight obliquely sloping mouth cleft, a projecting upper jaw and a lower jaw longer than the depth of the caudal peduncle. The anal fin has nine and a half branched soft rays and there are usually forty-four vertebrae. The colour of this fish is bright silver and the scales are easily shed. The pectoral, pelvic and anal fins are yellowish. The scales on the flank have a few black dots on the margin.

Distribution and habitat
Squalius janae is endemic to the Istrian peninsular in the northern end of the Adriatic Sea. It occurs in the Dragonja, Boljunčica and Pazinčica Rivers and their tributaries. The Dragonja flows west to the sea. The bed of the river is stretches of bare limestone alternating with pools with sediment on the floor. The Pazinčica at one time also flowed west to the sea but now terminates in a cave at Pazin. The Boljunčica flows southwards but terminates in a series of canals in an area that used to be Čepić Lake. This fish normally inhabits small rivers and streams which become shallow and partially dry up in summer, at which time it survives in pools. Another closely related species, Squalius squalus, inhabits nearby rivers, and Squalius janae was only distinguished as a separate species in 2010.

Biology
Little is known of the reproduction of this fish. Adults with ripe gonads have been found in May and early July and adults that have already spawned have been found in late July. Examination of the stomach contents of this fish showed algae, plant material and detritus.

Status
It is locally common and its population is believed to be stable but the area experiences drought in summer and this, and the possible introduction of other species of fish into these rivers, is a potential threat.

References

Squalius
Fish described in 2010
Cyprinid fish of Europe